The Big Eight Conference was a high school athletic league in Iowa made up of some of the largest schools in the state.

Members
Ames
Cedar Falls
Fort Dodge
Marshalltown
Mason City
Newton
Waterloo East
Waterloo West

History
The Big Eight Conference was formed in 1963 when Des Moines North and Des Moines East left the old Big Six Conference to compete in the Metropolitan Conference. The league's four remaining members (Fort Dodge, Mason City, and the Waterloo schools) reached out to other large schools in central Iowa to rebuild the conference. Cedar Falls joined from the Northeast Iowa Conference and Ames, Marshalltown, and Newton joined from the Central Iowa Conference. The conference became known as the Big Nine Conference when Waterloo Central opened in 1972. The name would be changed back to the Big Eight Conference in 1988 when Waterloo Central, as part of a school district reorganization, was converted to a junior high school. 

From the onset, the league was one of the strongest in the state. In its first year of competition, league schools captured state championships in four of the seven sports the IHSAA conducted championships for at the time. The league also claimed the first two 5-on-5 girls' basketball titles in state history (for many years the IGHSAU only sponsored 6-on-6 basketball). Among other notable achievements, the league also had a stronghold on the boys' cross country title for 12 years, winning a state title all but one year from 1964 to 1975.

The league was stable until the late 1980s when Newton and Ames left to join the Central Iowa Metro League. Soon after, the other members of the conference began looking for new homes. Marshalltown found a home in the CIML. Cedar Falls, Waterloo East, and Waterloo West then joined the Mississippi Valley Conference and Fort Dodge and Mason City, geographic outliers to among the rest of the state's largest schools, followed Marshalltown, Ames, and Newton to the CIML after being originally being declined membership in the league.

State Champions

Ames
Boys' Basketball: 1973, 1976, 1991
Boys' Cross Country: 1967, 1968, 1973, 1975, 1983, 1989
Boys' Golf: 1968, 1982, 1986
Boys' Swimming: 1982
Boys' Track & Field: 1964, 1965, 1968, 1971, 1972, 1980, 1986, 1987, 1988, 1989, 1990, 1991
Girls' Golf: 1989
Girls' Track & Field: 1981, 1987, 1988

Cedar Falls
Football: 1986
Boys' Cross Country: 1969
Wrestling: 1968, 1976
Girls' Golf: 1975
Girls' Swimming: 1986

Fort Dodge
Baseball: 1969
Boys' Basketball: 1988
Wrestling: 1980, 1985
Girls' Basketball: 1985

Marshalltown
Baseball: 1976, 1981, 1985, 1986
Boys' Basketball: 1966
Boys' Cross Country: 1964, 1965, 1966, 1974, 1975
Boys' Track & Field: 1985
Girls' Basketball: 1986

Mason City
Baseball: 1972
Football: 1978
Boys' Cross Country: 1972, 1973
Boys' Swimming: 1975, 1979, 1991
Girls' Swimming: 1987, 1988, 1989

Newton
Boys' Basketball: 1964
Football: 1980
Boys' Golf: 1990

Waterloo East
Boys' Basketball: 1974, 1990
Boys' Track & Field: 1979
Wrestling: 1964, 1983

Waterloo West
Baseball: 1991
Boys' Cross Country: 1970
Boys' Golf: 1971, 1972, 1973, 1977
Boys' Tennis: 1991
Boys' Track & Field: 1981
Wrestling: 1965, 1966, 1967, 1969, 1971, 1972, 1977, 1989
Girls' Golf: 1981

1963 establishments in Iowa
High school sports conferences and leagues in the United States
High school sports in Iowa
Sports leagues established in 1963
Defunct sports leagues in the United States